The table below lists the judgments of the Constitutional Court of South Africa delivered in 2020.

The members of the court at the start of 2020 were Chief Justice Mogoeng Mogoeng, Deputy Chief Justice Raymond Zondo, and judges Johan Froneman, Chris Jafta, Sisi Khampepe, Mbuyiseli Madlanga, Steven Majiedt, Nonkosi Mhlantla, Leona Theron and Zukisa Tshiqi. At the start of the year there was one vacancy, and a second was created when Justice Froneman retired with effect from 31 May.

References
 

2020
Constitutional Court